Ali Aoun is the Algerian Minister of Pharmaceutical Industry. He was appointed as minister on 9 September 2022.

References 

Algerian politicians
Year of birth missing (living people)
Living people